Bari International Film Festival (Bif&st) is an annual film festival held since 2009 in Bari, Italy.

Sections
International competition
National competition
Retrospectives of Italian and international cinema.

References 

Film festivals in Italy